Lykke is a surname. Notable people with the surname include:

 Anne Lykke (1595–1641), Danish noblewoman and royal mistress of Christian, Prince Elect of Denmark

 Lykke Li (born Li Lykke, 1986), Swedish singer-songwriter
 Nina Lykke (born 1949), Swedish professor of gender studies at Linköping University
 Sophie Lykke (d. 1570), Danish county administrator, landholder and noble